The Wonders Still Awaiting is the eighth studio album by German symphonic metal band Xandria. The album was released on 3 February 2023 via Napalm Records.

It is the first studio album to feature lead vocalist Ambre Vourvahis, Tim Schwarz on bass, drummer Dimitros Gatsios and guitarist Rob Klawonn.

Track listing

Notes
 The mediabook edition features a second disc, containing the orchestral versions of the first disc.

Personnel 
All information from the album booklet.

Xandria
 Marco Heubaum – guitars, keyboards, programming, backing vocals
 Ambre Vourvahis – lead vocals
 Rob Klawonn – guitars
 Tim Schwarz – bass guitar
 Dimitrios Gatsios – drums

Additional musicians
 Ralf Scheepers – guest vocals on "You Will Never Be Our God"
 Ally Storch – violin, cello
 McAlbi – low whistle
 Johannes Schiefner – uillean pipes

Production
 Zacarias Guterres – artwork
 Jacob Hansen – mixing, mastering
 Luki Knoebi – orchestral arrangements
 Christoph Wieczorek – engineering
 Julian Breucker – engineering

Charts

References 

2023 albums
Napalm Records albums
Xandria albums